Brigadier Sir Lindsay Tasman Ride, CBE, JP, ED, MD, MRCS, LRCP, Hon LLD (10 October 1898 – 17 October 1977) was an Australian physiologist, soldier, and vice chancellor of the University of Hong Kong.

Early life 
Ride was born in Newstead, Victoria. He was the fifth child of Australian-born parents William Ride and Eliza Mary (née Best). His father was a pioneering Presbyterian missionary and his mother the daughter of a stonemason.

Education and WWI
Ride attended three state schools in the country before being awarded a scholarship to Scotch College, Melbourne.  There, he excelled in sport and won a senior government scholarship. On 14 February 1917, Ride enlisted in the AIF. Early in 1918, he joined the 38th Battalion on the Western Front. He was twice wounded, once seriously. Subsequently, on 24 April 1919, he was 'invalided out' of the army.

Medical studies
Ride enrolled in medicine at the University of Melbourne. There he took an active interest in sport by participating in rifle shooting, athletics, rowing, cricket and football. He was the president of the Students' Representative Council from 1921 to 1922. Ride was elected Victorian Rhodes scholar for 1922. At New College, Oxford, 'Blue' Ride as he was known, became captain of boats and steward of the junior common-room. With only mediocre academic results, authorities were nevertheless impressed to the point that they rated him 'a good Rhodes Scholar' and a 'first rate fellow'.

Becoming a surgeon
He worked at Guy's Hospital and qualified as a member of the Royal College of Surgeons, as well as a licentiate of the Royal College of Physicians, London.

Marriage
On 30 June 1925, in Church of Scotland tradition, Ride married Canadian Mary Margaret Louise Fenety at St Columba's Church, Chelsea, London.

Life in Hong Kong
Perhaps because of his natural ability for medical research, he was appointed professor of physiology at the University of Hong Kong on 21 October 1928. There, "Doc Ride", as he was known, investigated in the blood groups of the peoples of the Pacific. In 1938, he wrote Genetics and the Clinician, published in Bristol, England. Ride was commissioned in the Hong Kong Volunteer Defence Corps and was appointed a justice of the peace. He was a keen rower and played for the Hong Kong Cricket Club. Ride became an elder in the Union Church. Possessing the voice of a baritone, he helped to found the Hong Kong Singers in 1934.

WWII and the Battle of Hong Kong

Ride sent his wife and children to Australia in 1938 in anticipation of a Japanese invasion into the British colony. In 1941, Ride commanded the Hong Kong Field Ambulance. He became a POW and was held in the prison established by the Japanese at the Sham Shui Po Barracks after Hong Kong capitulated on Christmas Day 1941. 

On 9 January 1942, with the help of Hong Kong guerilla forces, he managed to escape to unoccupied Chungking, a feat for which he was appointed O.B.E. in 1942. While a colonel in the Indian Army, Ride formed and commanded the British Army Aid Group, headquartered in Kweilin, Kwangsi. This MI9 unit provided help, medical and otherwise, to POW escapees from Hong Kong while gathering intelligence. Due to his outstanding leadership after escaping, 'The Smiling Tiger' as he was nicknamed, was elevated to C.B.E. in 1944. From the formation in 1949 of the Royal Hong Kong Defence Force Ride was appointed commandant, first with the rank of Colonel, subsequently promoted to the rank of Brigadier in 1956, until his retirement in 1967.

Life as Vice Chancellor
Ride was appointed vice-chancellor to a dilapidated, post-war University of Hong Kong in April 1949. 22 new buildings were erected and student numbers increased threefold in the 15 years after his appointment. He had been described as decisive, genial and authoritarian all at the same time. Ride enjoyed unwavering support among older staff but his paternalistic tendencies failed to endear him to staff who were appointed in later years. His HKU papers are available at the University of Hong Kong Archives.

Honours and public duties
Appointed OBE in 1942
Made CBE in 1944
Knight Bachelor in 1962

Education
Honorary doctorates in Law from the University of Toronto, the University of Melbourne, the University of London and The University of Hong Kong

Singing
Honorary Member of the Royal Academy of Music, London (1962)
President and conductor of the Hong Kong Singers
He was chairman of the Hong Kong Music Society

Military
Honorary Colonel of the Hong Kong Regiment

Others
In 1967, Ride was a member of the 1967 commission of inquiry into the 1966 Kowloon riots. He was also the author of A Monumental Survey of the Old Protestant Cemetery in Macau

Personal life
Ride's marriage to his first wife Mary ended because of WWII. He married for the second time on 12 November 1954 at the Union Church in Hong Kong. Violet May Witchell, his second wife, had been his secretary before the war and had been interned in Stanley camp in Hong Kong during the war.

Death
Sir Lindsay died on 17 October 1977 in Hong Kong and was cremated. He was survived by his widow, and his children (two sons and two daughters) from his first marriage. 

His son was the noted zoologist William David Lindsay Ride. His grandson is the writer, curator, and academic Peter Ride.

The Ming-Ai (London) Institute interviewed Ride's daughter as part of the British Chinese Armed Forces Heritage project.

Notes

Vice-Chancellors of the University of Hong Kong
1898 births
1977 deaths
People educated at Scotch College, Melbourne
Hong Kong people of Australian descent
Hong Kong justices of the peace
Hong Kong in World War II
University of Melbourne alumni
Australian Presbyterians
Australian Rhodes Scholars
Australian expatriates in Hong Kong
Alumni of New College, Oxford
Knights Bachelor
Commanders of the Order of the British Empire